The Bardy Bunch: The War of the Families Partridge and Brady is a musical parody written by Stephen Garvey. The show is a mash-up of a dozen Shakespeare plays and set in the 1970s amid a war between the popular sitcom families Partridge and Brady. The musical features 15 hit songs made famous on The Partridge Family and The Brady Bunch including "I Think I Love You," "It's a Sunshine Day," and "I Woke Up In Love This Morning."

Productions 
The Bardy Bunch premiered in 2011 at the New York International Fringe Festival, where it won an Overall Excellence Award for Outstanding Ensemble. It went on to play a sold-out Off-Broadway run at the Theatre at St. Clement’s in the spring of 2014. 

Both productions included the creative team of director Jay Stern, choreographer Lorna Ventura, music director Logan Medland, scenic designer Craig Napoliello and technical director Matt Schiffman. Tony Award-winning lighting designer Howell Binkley joined the Off Broadway production.

in September 2016, the show opened at the Mercury Theatre in Chicago, again directed by Jay Stern, and featuring the creative team of Lorna Ventura and Logan Medland. Mike Timoney and Disappearing Dog, LLC produced.

Plot
It is the summer of 1974 and the sitcom-perfect Sunshine Days are about to come to an end for the Bradys and the Partridges. The two singing families meet for the first time after being double-booked at the same gig, and a feud immediately erupts. So, too, do the passions of Keith Partridge and Marcia Brady, who fall in love at first sight.

That night, Keith woos Marcia outside her window and together they hatch a plan to bring peace to the warring families, by convincing Greg Brady and Laurie Partridge that they are secretly in love with each other. Laurie disguises herself as a man to befriend Greg and test his loyalty.

Other, more nefarious, plots abound: Carol Brady, a la Lady Macbeth, convinces Mike to murder his boss, Mr. Phillips, and take his job. Meanwhile, a conniving Chris Partridge schemes to take over as bassist in the family band by driving his brother Danny to madness and persuading him to believe that their manager, Reuben Kincaid, killed their father to win the hand of their mother, Shirley. Confusing? Perhaps. But this is how Shakespeare rolled. 

Many deaths ensue – some plotted, some accidental, some involving frozen steak—and many ghosts abound. Blood is shed, corny jokes are told, and groovy songs are sung. By the final act, virtually all our favorite characters have canceled each other out—just as their shows were slain in the summer of 1974. But, modern classics that they are, “The Brady Bunch” and “The Partridge Family” live on, in rerun heaven, and in the hearts of fans all over the world.

Musical numbers
 “Keep On” - The Brady Kids
 “Looking For A Good Time” - The Partridge Family
 “Together We’re Better”	 - Carol Brady, Mike Brady
 “I Woke Up In Love This Morning” - Keith Partridge, Marcia Brady, Mike Brady, Carol Brady, Shirley Partridge, Reuben Kincaid
 “It’s a Sunshine Day/Sunshine” - The Company
 “I Can Feel Your Heartbeat” - The Company
 “Time To Change” - Peter Brady, Cindy Brady
 “I’ll Meet You Halfway” - Shirley Partridge, Danny Partridge
 “Roller Coaster” - The Company
 “Doesn’t Somebody Want To Be Wanted” - 	Jan Brady
 “I’m On My Way Back Home” - Mike Brady, Carol Brady, Danny Partridge, Shirley Partridge, Reuben Kincaid, Greg Brady
 “It’s One Of Those Nights (Yes, Love)” - Keith Partridge
 “I Think I Love You” - Keith Partridge, Marcia Brady, Greg Brady, Laurie Partridge
 “Together We’re Better/Finale" - The Company

Cast

References

Musicals based on television series
Plays and musicals based on works by William Shakespeare
2011 musicals